Hive is a hamlet in the East Riding of Yorkshire, England. It lies just to the north of the M62 motorway.

Hive forms part of the civil parish of Gilberdyke.

In 1823 Hive was in the civil parish of Eastrington, and the Wapentake and Liberty of Howdenshire. Occupations at the time included six farmers.

References

External links

Villages in the East Riding of Yorkshire